Belden is an Americanized surname, and may refer to:

 Bob Belden (born 1956), American saxophonist
 Brace Belden (born 1989), American podcaster and union activist
 Bunny Belden (1900–1976), American football player
 Charles Belden (1887–1966), American photographer
 Doug Belden (1927–1972), American football player
 Frederick H. Belden (1909–1979), Bishop of Rhode Island
 George O. Belden (1797–1833), American politician
 Ira Belden (1874–1916), American baseball player
 Jack Belden (1910–1989), American war correspondent
 James J. Belden (1825–1904), American politician
 Josiah Belden (1815–1892), American politician
 Thomas Belden (1731–1806), American politician
 Timothy Belden (born 1967), American criminal
 Trixie Belden, a fictional character

Americanized surnames